Shankar Narayanan is an Indian born American entrepreneur based out of the U.S. and India.

External links 
 
 http://www.mydigitalfc.com/views/bshankar-narayananab-can%E2%80%88and%E2%80%88able-310
 http://www.vikatan.com//article.php?module=magazine&aid=94693
 http://www.vikatan.com/new/article.php?module=magazine&aid=94693
 http://www.mydigitalfc.com/news/your-service-484
 http://www.scribd.com/doc/94167931/ET-2005
 http://www.vikatan.com/new/article.php?module=magazine&aid=94693
 GPS Business News Interview
 Highbeam Research Interview
 
 Economic Times
 Economic Times

Businesspeople from Madurai
American people of Indian descent
American businesspeople
Living people
Year of birth missing (living people)